Casper Charles Wells V (born November 23, 1984) is an American former professional baseball outfielder. He played in Major League Baseball for the Detroit Tigers, Seattle Mariners, Oakland Athletics, Chicago White Sox, and Philadelphia Phillies from 2010 to 2013.

Early life
Wells attended Schenectady High School in Schenectady, New York and Towson University, where he played college baseball for the Towson Tigers baseball team in the Colonial Athletic Association. He is the fifth member of his family to carry the name Casper.

Professional career

Detroit Tigers

The Detroit Tigers selected Wells in the 14th round, with the 420th overall selection, of the 2005 Major League Baseball draft. The Tigers promoted Wells to the major leagues on May 14, 2010, in place of pitcher Alfredo Figaro. Wells returned to Toledo on May 21 but was recalled to Detroit on August 23 in place of Enrique González.

Seattle Mariners
On July 30, 2011, Wells was traded to the Seattle Mariners along with LHP Charlie Furbush, prospect Francisco Martínez and a player to be named later (Chance Ruffin) for Doug Fister and David Pauley.

Wells had early success at Seattle. He was able to put together a continuous streak of 4 games where he had a home run in each from August 13 through 16, 2011. The streak was halted when he was hit by a pitch in the nose by Brandon Morrow.

Wells was designated for assignment by the Mariners on March 31, 2013, and was claimed on waivers by the Toronto Blue Jays on April 10, 2013. Wells was activated on April 12, but was designated for assignment on April 15 without appearing in a game to make room on the 40-man roster for Ramón Ortiz.

Oakland Athletics
Wells was traded to the Oakland Athletics on April 22, 2013, for cash. He was added to the 40-man and 25-man rosters when second baseman Scott Sizemore re-tore his ACL. Wells was designated for assignment on April 28 when Yoenis Céspedes returned from the disabled list.  Wells had started a mere two games for the Athletics, one in left field and one as the designated hitter.

Chicago White Sox
The Oakland A's traded Wells to the White Sox for cash on April 29, 2013.

Philadelphia Phillies
On August 8, 2013, the Philadelphia Phillies claimed Wells off of waivers from the Chicago White Sox for a player to be named later.

On August 24, after starting the night in right field, Wells pitched in the 18th inning of a game against the Arizona Diamondbacks, making him a position player to have pitched in both leagues in the same year. He became the losing pitcher, and was tabbed with a 27.08 ERA after giving up 5 runs to the Diamondbacks.  Wells was also 0-for-7 batting that night.

Wells appeared as a pinch runner the following day, but on August 27, he was placed on the disabled list with dry eye syndrome as a result of lasik surgery on his eyes.  Wells returned to action for one at-bat as a pinch hitter in late September, in what was to be his final major league appearance.

Wells was outrighted off the roster on October 16.

Chicago Cubs
Wells signed a minor league deal with the Chicago Cubs on November 20, 2013.  On May 19, 2014, Wells joined the team's AAA-level Iowa Cubs farm team from extended spring training.  On June 25, 2014, Iowa released Wells.

Bridgeport Bluefish
Wells signed with the Bridgeport Bluefish of the Atlantic League to finish out the 2014 season.

Return to Detroit
On February 21, 2015, the Detroit Tigers signed Wells to a minor league contract. Wells was released on May 1, 2015.

References

External links

1984 births
Living people
Baseball players from Detroit
Bridgeport Bluefish players
Chicago White Sox players
Detroit Tigers players
Erie SeaWolves players
Gulf Coast Tigers players
Iowa Cubs players
Lakeland Flying Tigers players
Lakeland Tigers players
Leones del Caracas players
American expatriate baseball players in Venezuela
Leones del Escogido players
American expatriate baseball players in the Dominican Republic
Major League Baseball outfielders
Mesa Solar Sox players
Oakland Athletics players
Oneonta Tigers players
Peoria Javelinas players
Philadelphia Phillies players
Seattle Mariners players
Baseball players from Grand Rapids, Michigan
Sportspeople from Schenectady, New York
Tacoma Rainiers players
Toledo Mud Hens players
Towson Tigers baseball players
Towson University alumni
West Michigan Whitecaps players